Terry Williams is a sociologist, academic and author whose work includes urban social policy and related fields. He founded the Harlem Writers Crew Project.

Publications (Books) 

 Translations: French (1990), Japanese (1991)
 Review, Publishers Weekly
 Translations: French (1994)

 It was reviewed by Kirkus Reviews

Early life and career 
Williams received his Ph.D. in sociology from the Graduate School and University Center of City University of New York.. Prior to this, he got his Bachelor of Arts degree, cum Laude, from Richmond College (CUNY). He has been a professor at Princeton University and Professor at the New School for Social Research in New York City.

References 

American sociologists
Living people
Year of birth missing (living people)